Modo Island is a small island in Ganghwa Bay, off South Korea's west coast.  It is part of Bukdo myeon, Ongjin County, Incheon Metropolitan City. Baemikkumi Sculpture Park is in the southern part of the island.

References

Islands of Incheon
Ongjin County, Incheon